Mimomys is an extinct genus of voles that lived in Eurasia and North America during the Plio-Pleistocene. It is believed that one of the many species belonging to this genus gave rise to the modern water voles (Arvicola). Several other prehistoric genera of vole are probably synonymous with Mimomys, including the North American Cosomys and Ophiomys.

Several species are known to have survived into the Late Pleistocene, including M. pyrenaicus of France and M. chandolensis of the Russian Far East, which may have survived as recently as 50,000 BP.

References

Prehistoric mammals of Europe
Prehistoric mammals of Asia
Prehistoric mammals of North America
Pliocene mammals of Europe
Pliocene mammals of Asia
Pliocene mammals of North America
Pleistocene mammals of Europe
Pleistocene mammals of Asia
Pleistocene mammals of North America
Pliocene rodents
Pleistocene rodents
Prehistoric rodents
Pleistocene extinctions
Arvicolini